The boyars of Moldavia and Wallachia were the nobility of the Danubian Principalities of Moldavia and Wallachia. The title was either inherited or granted by the Hospodar, often together with an administrative function. The boyars held much of the political power in the principalities and, until the Phanariote era, they elected the Hospodar. 
As such, until the 19th century, the system oscillated between an oligarchy and an autocracy with the power concentrated in the hospodar's hands.

Origins
During the Middle Ages, Romanians lived in autonomous communities called obște which mixed private and common ownership, employing an open field system.  The private ownership of land gained ground In the 14th and 15th centuries, leading to differences within the obște towards a stratification of the members of the community.

The name of the "boyars" (boier in Romanian; the institution being called boierie) was patented from the Russian Empire, which had significant power and influence over Moldavia.

The creation of the feudal domain in which the landlords were known as boyars, was mostly through danii ("donations") system: the hospodars gave away whole villages to military servants, usurping the right of property of the obște. By the 16th century, the few remaining still-free villages were forcefully taken over by boyars, while some people were forced to agree to become serfs (see Serfdom in Moldavia and Wallachia) due to hunger, invasions, high taxes, debts, which further deteriorated the economic standing of the free peasants.

Apart from the court boyars and the military elite, some boyars ("countryside boyars") arose from within the villages, when a leader of the obște (usually called knyaz) swore fealty to the hospodar and becoming the landlord of the village.

Feudal era

The hospodar was considered the supreme ruler of the land and he received a land rent from the peasants, who also had to pay a rent to the boyar who owned the land. The boyars were generally excepted from any taxes and rents to be paid to the hospodar. The boyars were entitled to a rent that was a percentage of the peasants' produce (initially one-tenth, hence its name, dijmă) in addition to a number of days of unpaid labour (corvée, locally known as clacă or robotă).

However, not all landlords who owned villages were boyars, a different class existed of landlords without a boyar title, called cneji or judeci in Wallachia and nemeși in Moldavia. They were however not tax-exempt like the boyars. The upper boyars (known as vlastelin in Wallachia) had to supply the hospodar with a number of warriors proportional to the number of villages they owned.

Some boyars were court officials, the office being called dregătorie, while others were boyars without a function. Important offices at the court that were held by boyars included vistier (treasurer), stolnic (pantler), vornic (concierge) and logofăt (chancellor). While early the court officials were not important and often they were not even boyars, with time, boyars started to desire the functions, in order to participate in the government of the country, but also to get the incomes that were afferent to each function.

While the era is often called "feudal" in the Romanian historiography, there were some major differences between the status of the Western feudal lords and the status of the Romanian boyars. While a hierarchy existed in Wallachia and Moldavia just like in the West, the power balance was titled towards the hospodar, who had everyone as subjects and who had the power to demote even the richest boyar, to confiscate his wealth or even behead him. However, the power for the election of the hospodar was held by the great boyar families, who would form groups and alliances, often leading to disorder and instability.

Phanariote era

After the Phanariote regime was instated in Moldavia (1711) and Wallachia (1716), many of the boyar class was made out of Constantinople Greeks who belonged to the Phanariote clients, who became officials and were assimilated to the boyar class or locals who bought their titles. When coming to Bucharest or Iași, the new Phanariote hospodars came with a Greek retinue who were given the most important official jobs; many of these Greeks married into local boyar families. In order to consolidate their position within the Wallachian and Moldavian boyar class, the officials were allowed to keep their boyar title after the end of their term.

The official functions, which traditionally were given for a year, were often bought with money as an investment, since the function would often give large incomes in return. While the official functions were often given to both Romanians and Greeks, there was an exception: throughout the Phanariote era, the treasurers were mostly local boyars because they were more competent in collecting taxes. When the descendants of a boyar were not able to obtain even the lowest function, they became "fallen  boyars" (mazili), who nevertheless, kept some fiscal privileges.

Many of the newly bestowed local boyars were wealthy merchants who paid in order to become boyars, in some cases they were even forced by the hospodar to become boyars (and thus pay the hospodar a sum). The princely courts of Bucharest and Iași kept title registers, which included a list of all the boyars (known as Arhondologia). Since the hospodar wanted to maximize his income, it was in his interest to create as many boyars as possible (and receive money from each), leading to an inflation in the number of boyars.

The economic basis of the boyar's class was land ownership: by the 18th century, more than half of the land of Wallachia and Moldavia being owned by them. For instance, according to the 1803 Moldavian census, out of the 1711 villages and market towns, the boyars owned 927 of them. The process that began during the feudal era, of boyars seizing properties from the free peasants, continued and accelerated during this period.

The boyars wore costumes similar to those of the Turkish nobility, with the difference that instead of the turban, most of them wore a very large Kalpak. Female members of the boyar class also wore Turkish inspired costume. Many boyars used large sums of money for conspicuous consumption, particularly luxurious clothing, but also carriages, jewelry and furniture. The luxury of the boyars' lives contrasted strongly not only with the squalor of the Romanian villages, but also with the general appearance of the capitals, this contrast striking the foreigners who visited the Principalities. In the first decade of the 19th-century, female members of the boyar class started to adopt Western fashion: in July 1806, the wife of the hospodar in Iași, Safta Ipsilanti, received the wife of the French consul dressed according to the French fashion. Male boyars, however, did not reform their costume to Western fashion until around the 1840s.

The opening towards Western Europe meant that the boyars adopted the Western mores and the luxury expenses increased. While the greater boyars were able to afford these expenses through the intensification of the exploitation of their domains (and the peasants working on them), many smaller boyars were ruined by them.

Early modern

1848 Revolution

Modern Romania
Starting with the middle of the 19th century, the word "boyar" began to lose its meaning as a "noble" and to mean simply "large landowner". Cuza's Constitution (known as the Statut) of 1864 deprived the boyars from the legal privileges and the ranks officially disappeared, but, through their wealth, they retained their economic and political influence, particularly through the electoral system of census suffrage. Some of the lower boyars joined the bourgeoisie involved in commerce and industry.

A number of 2000 large landowners held over 3 million hectares or about 38% of all arable land. Most of these boyars no longer took any part in managing their estates, but rather lived in Bucharest or in Western Europe (particularly France, Italy and Switzerland). They leased their estates for a fixed sum to arendași (leaseholders). Many of the boyars found themselves in financial difficulties; many of their estates had been mortgaged. The lack of interest in agriculture and their domains led to a dissolution of the boyar class.

Legacy
The movement surrounding the Sămănătorul magazine lamented the disappearance of the boyar class, while not arguing for their return. Historian Nicolae Iorga saw the system not as a selfish exploitation of the peasants by the boyars, but rather as a rudimentary democracy. On the other side of the political spectrum, Marxist thinker Constantin Dobrogeanu-Gherea thought that the reforms didn't go far enough, arguing that the condition of the peasants was a neo-serfdom.

Notes

References
V. Costăchel, P. P. Panaitescu, A. Cazacu. (1957) Viața feudală în Țara Românească și Moldova (secolele XIV–XVI) ("Feudal life in the Romanian and Moldovan Land (14th–16th centuries)", Bucharest, Editura Științifică
Ștefan Ionescu, Bucureștii în vremea fanarioților ("Bucharest in the Time of the Phanariotes"), Editura Dacia, Cluj, 1974.
Neagu Djuvara, Între Orient și Occident. Țările române la începutul epocii moderne, Humanitas, Bucharest, 2009. 
Keith Hitchins, Rumania: 1866–1947, Oxford University Press, 1994

External links 

Boyars
Boyars
Boyars